Out with Dad may refer to:
 "Out with Dad", an episode in the seventh season of the American situation comedy Frasier
 Out With Dad (web series), a web series produced in Canada